Shepard Bancroft Clough (December 6, 1901 – June 7, 1990) was an American economic historian. He was a professor of European history at Columbia University.

Biography 
Clough was born on December 6, 1901, in Bloomington, Indiana, and moved to Lebanon, New Hampshire in 1903. He graduated from Colby Academy in 1919 and received his bachelor's degree from Colgate University in 1923. He then did his postgraduate work at the Sorbonne and Heidelberg. He received his doctorate from Columbia University, where he began teaching in 1928. 

During World War II, Clough was in the economics division of the United States Department of State and lectured at the U.S. Army School of Military Government at the University of Virginia. He became a Knight in the Order of Merit of the Italian Republic and a chevalier of the Legion of Honour after the war.

Clough was the author of a number of books on European economic history and civilizational cycles. He was also a visiting professor at Sciences Po and the University of Grenoble.

Clough retired in 1970 from teaching. He died on June 7, 1990 in St. Johnsbury, Vermont.

References 

1901 births
1990 deaths

People from Bloomington, Indiana
Colgate University alumni
Columbia Graduate School of Arts and Sciences alumni
United States Department of State officials
Columbia University faculty
20th-century American historians
Knights of the Order of Merit of the Italian Republic
Chevaliers of the Légion d'honneur